Henryk Niezabitowski (26 December 1896 – 26 June 1976) was a Polish rower. He competed in the men's eight event at the 1928 Summer Olympics.

References

1896 births
1976 deaths
Polish male rowers
Olympic rowers of Poland
Rowers at the 1928 Summer Olympics
Rowers from Warsaw
People from Warsaw Governorate
Polish Scouts and Guides
Polish Military Organisation members
Polish people of the Polish–Soviet War
Polish military personnel of World War II
World War II prisoners of war held by Germany
Polish ice hockey players